The seventh season of Bake Off Brasil premiered on July 24, 2021, at  on SBT.

Bakers
The following is a list of contestants:

Results summary

Key

Technical challenges ranking

Ratings and reception

Brazilian ratings
All numbers are in points and provided by Kantar Ibope Media.

References

External links 

 Bake Off Brasil on SBT

2021 Brazilian television seasons